Ratrospective is a 1983 EP by The Boomtown Rats. It was designed as a compilation of the singles that had been released to the US market and was released on the Columbia Records label.

Track listing
 "Never in a Million Years" - (Geldof) - 3:49
 "I Don't Like Mondays" - (Geldof) - 4:18
 "Joey's on the Street Again" - (Geldof) - 5:51
 "Rat Trap" - (Geldof) - 5:08
 "She's So Modern" - (Fingers, Geldof) - 2:55
 "Up All Night" - (Geldof) - 3:34

References

1983 compilation albums
The Boomtown Rats albums
Columbia Records compilation albums